Kazkommertsbank was the largest private bank in Kazakhstan with a total market share of 24%. Kazkommertsbank merged with Halyk Bank on 27 July 2018.

About
Kazkommertsbank is a large provider of banking services and other financial products to large and medium-sized corporations in all sectors of Kazakh economy.

Its commercial banking business primarily consists of corporate banking, trade and project finance, personal banking, debit and credit card services and foreign currency trading.

Its principal activities are the acceptance of deposits and the provision of loans and credit facilities in Tenge and foreign currencies. The Bank is also a major participant in the securities market and the foreign currency market in Kazakhstan.

The bank introduced "mini-mobile POS terminals" in 2013 for customers to be able to use a smart phone or tablet computer to accept credit card payments. According to CISTRAN Finance, the increase in card payments in 2012 led to a 0.6 percent growth in Kazakhstan's GDP.

See also

 Banks of Kazakhstan
 Nurzhan Subkhanberdin

References

Banks of Kazakhstan
Banks established in 1990
1990 establishments in the Soviet Union